KCRS may refer to:

 KCRS (AM), a radio station (550 AM) licensed to Midland, Texas, United States
 KCRS-FM, a radio station (103.3 FM) licensed to Midland, Texas, United States